Choral Arts Philadelphia (formerly Choral Arts Society of Philadelphia) is a 40-voice choir with an 8-voice professional core and semi-professional and amateur auditioned volunteer singers. The ensemble was founded in 1982 in Philadelphia as a symphonic chorus of 120+ voices. It is currently directed by Matthew Glandorf, who also serves on the faculty of the Curtis Institute of Music.  The group has performed nearly 200 works by more than 100 composers.

In 2002, while under direction of Donald Nally, the Choral Arts Society of Philadelphia was awarded the Margaret Hillis Award for Choral Excellence, presented to a single chorus each year by Chorus America.  That same year, the group was named Best of Philly by Philadelphia Magazine.

Throughout its history, the Choral Arts [Society of] Philadelphia has been dedicated to the commissioning and performance of new music.  The choir has performed world premieres of works by Robert Convery, Edward Bilous, Jake Heggie, Robert Maggio, Neely Bruce, Thomas Jennefelt, Jonathan Harvey, among others.  In 2007, as part of its 25th anniversary season, the group presented a world premiere by Roxanna Panufnik. In 2012, Choral Arts Philadelphia recorded an album of choral music by composer David Ludwig.

In addition to presenting a three- or four-concert season of its own each year, Choral Arts has been a frequent collaborator with other Philadelphia cultural groups including the Philadelphia Orchestra, the Chamber Orchestra of Philadelphia, Piffaro, The Pennsylvania Ballet, Tempesta di Mare.

In 2013, Choral Arts Philadelphia launched "Bach At Seven" Cantata Series, an hour-long mid-week programs featuring a Bach cantata along with theme-related choral, solo and orchestral works from all periods. The series take place at Saint Clement's Episcopal Church in Philadelphia and continue throughout the season, mostly on a monthly basis.

External links
 Choral Arts Philadelphia website

Musical groups from Philadelphia
Culture of Philadelphia
Choirs in Pennsylvania
Choral societies
Musical groups established in 1982
1982 establishments in Pennsylvania